This is a list of science fiction action films.

0-9

A

B

C

D

E

Encounter

F

G

H

I

J

K

L

M

N

O

P

Q
The Quick and the Undead

R

S

T

U

V

W

X

Y

Z
Zeiram
Zombie Wars
Zone of the Dead

See also
 Lists of horror films
 Lists of science fiction films
 List of science fiction comedy films
 List of science fiction horror films

References

External links

 
action
Science fiction